Sir Christopher Robert Chope  (born 19 May 1947) is a British barrister and politician who has served as the Member of Parliament (MP) for Christchurch in Dorset since 1997. A member of the Conservative Party, he was first elected in 1983 for Southampton Itchen, but lost this seat in 1992 to Labour. He returned to Parliament in 1997 and has remained an MP ever since. A Brexit advocate, Chope has been supportive of Leave Means Leave, a Eurosceptic pressure group.

Early life
Christopher Chope was born in Putney, the son of Pamela (née Durell) and Robert Charles Chope (1913–1988), a circuit judge and former judge of county courts. He was educated at the St Andrew's Preparatory School in Eastbourne and Marlborough College, before attending Queen's College at the University of St Andrews (now the University of Dundee) where he was awarded an LLB degree in 1970. He was a contemporary of Michael Fallon and
Michael Forsyth, and was influenced by Madsen Pirie. He finished his education at the Inns of Court School of Law. Chope was called to the bar at the Inner Temple in 1972.

Chope was elected as a councillor on the Wandsworth London Borough Council in 1974 and became the council leader in 1979; he left the council on his first election to Parliament in 1983. Chope was appointed an Officer of the Order of the British Empire in the 1982 New Year Honours for services to local government.

Parliamentary career

Chope was elected as an MP at the 1983 general election for Southampton Itchen where he defeated the Social Democratic Party (and previously Labour) MP Bob Mitchell by 5,290 votes and became the first Conservative MP for Southampton Itchen since the constituency was created in 1950.

Chope was appointed as the Parliamentary Private Secretary to Peter Brooke, the Minister of State at the Treasury in 1986, before being promoted by Margaret Thatcher to serve in her government as the Parliamentary Under Secretary of State at the Department for the Environment later in the same year, where he was responsible for steering through the Council Tax legislation, the replacement for the disastrous and derided Poll tax, which was withdrawn after a massive popular revolt. He was moved under the leadership of John Major to serve in the same rank at the Department of Transport from 1990 until he lost his Southampton Itchen seat to John Denham at the 1992 general election.

After his defeat, Chope took up a consultancy with Ernst & Young in 1992, but was re-elected at the 1997 general election for the Christchurch constituency. In 1997, he became a spokesman on the Environment, Transport and the Regions as well as being the Vice Chairman of the Conservative Party under William Hague, but left the frontbench later that year when he became a member of the Trade and Industry Select committee. He returned to the frontbench after the 2001 election as a spokesman on the Treasury. In 2002, he moved to Transport, then left frontbench politics after the 2005 general election. He currently serves on the Panel of Chairs.

Chope was chairman of the Thatcherite Conservative Way Forward group and used to be a barrister in the Chambers of Peter Rawlinson.

During the expenses scandal of 2009, it emerged that Chope claimed £136,992 in parliamentary expenses in 2007–8. This included claiming £881 to repair a sofa.

On 11 October 2011, Chope questioned the time allotted to a debate on MPs' pensions. Because this debate came before a debate into the Hillsborough disaster inquiry, it was reported that Chope had threatened to delay the inquiry, leading to widespread criticism of Chope's actions.

Chope was criticised following remarks made on 17 January 2013 when he referred to House of Commons dining room staff as "servants" in a speech.

Chope was appointed a Knight Bachelor in the 2018 New Year Honours for political and public service.

Political views
On 10 February 2009, Chope co-sponsored an Employment Opportunities Bill to the House of Commons, which would have enabled workers to opt out of the minimum wage. The bill was objected to and later dropped.

Chope is sceptical of climate change and attended a meeting of climate change sceptics in the Palace of Westminster in October 2010.

Chope helped to lead backbench support for the motion calling for a referendum to leave the European Union. He has also been heavily involved in the use of private member's bills to achieve this aim. Chope has consistently supported Britain's withdrawal from the European Union. Prior to the 2016 referendum, he announced his support for Brexit. He has supported Leave Means Leave, a Eurosceptic pressure group.

Chope voted against the legislation for same-sex marriage in 2013.

In 2014, Chope voted against requiring all companies with more than 250 employees to declare the gap in pay between the average male and average female salaries.

In June 2013, Chope was one of four MPs who camped outside Parliament in a move to facilitate parliamentary debate on an 'Alternative Queen's Speech' – an attempt to show what a future Conservative government might deliver. 42 policies were listed including reintroduction of the death penalty and conscription, the privatisation of the BBC, banning the burka in public places, holding a referendum on same-sex marriage and preparing to leave the European Union. In 1990, while a Southampton MP, Chope voted for the reintroduction of the death penalty for murder under certain circumstances.

In July 2017, Chope and Peter Bone, the Conservative MP for Wellingborough, tabled 73 bills between them, of which 47 were placed by Chope. In order to be at the front of the queue to table the bills, the pair had camped in the Palace of Westminster for three days. Chope's bills included legislation to privatise the BBC and Channel 4, limit the interest rate chargeable on student loan debt (and forgive it in certain circumstances), reduce stamp duty, and decriminalise TV licence-dodging. Because of the number of slots for bills they took, Chope and Bone were criticised, including by Paul Flynn, for their actions.

In March 2019, Chope was one of 21 MPs who voted against LGBT inclusive sex and relationship education in English schools.

Chope maintained Rishi Sunak would be unable to unite the Conservative Party as Prime Minister, and urged him to call a general election.

Blocking and filibustering of bills
Chope is a member of a group of backbench Conservative MPs who regularly object to private members bills which, in their view, have not received sufficient scrutiny. These have included a number which were previously believed to have widespread public and parliamentary support. This conduct, along with his involvement in cutting the public housing budget during his time in government, has earned Chope the nickname "Chopper".

The BBC's parliamentary correspondent, Mark D'Arcy, said the group claims to "make a practice of ensuring that what they see as well-meaning but flabby legislation is not lazily plopped on to the statute book by a few MPs on a poorly attended Friday sitting." Chope said that he objects on principle to legislation being introduced to the statute books without debate: "[T]his is something I have fought for in most of my time as an MP and it goes to the very heart of the power balance between the government and Parliament. The government is abusing parliamentary time for its own ends and in a democracy this is not acceptable. The government cannot just bring in what it wants on the nod."

It has been suggested that Chope does not object to all such bills, particularly those that align with his own political views and those of his compatriots, with Conservative MP Zac Goldsmith commenting: "In case anyone is tempted to believe he has a principled objection to private members' bills, please note that once again he did not object to those put forward by his friends."

On 12 March 2010, he blocked a bill to protect poor countries from vulture funds, despite his party's support for the bill.

In December 2013, Chope objected to the second reading of the Alan Turing (Statutory Pardon) Bill in the House of Commons. Because of this, the government decided to act under the royal prerogative of mercy. On 24 December 2013, Queen Elizabeth II granted Turing a free pardon.

In November 2014, Chope blocked a bill that would have banned the use of wild animals in circus performances, on the basis that a bill on EU membership should have been called before the bill. In the same month, Chope, alongside Philip Davies, the Conservative MP for Shipley, filibustered a bill intended to make revenge evictions an offence. Defending his filibuster, Chope claimed that the bill would have weakened landlords' ability to recover possession, deterring them from letting properties. Chope was reported as having been a private landlord himself, but he denied these claims.

In October 2015, Chope, Davies and Conservative MP David Nuttall filibustered a private member's bill that would have placed restrictions on hospital parking charges for carers.

On 15 June 2018, Chope blocked the passage of a private member's bill that would have made upskirting a specific offence. Chope said that his reason for blocking the passage was in objection to parliamentary procedure rather than to the bill itself: he stated that he would "wholeheartedly" support a government bill that outlawed upskirting. Chope's actions drew immediate criticism from fellow MPs, including some in his own party. The prime minister, Theresa May, also expressed her disappointment at the objection. Following his objection, the government reaffirmed its commitment to introduce legislation to outlaw upskirting and the bill passed subject to royal assent in January 2019. In protest at his actions, staff at the House of Commons placed a bunting of women's underwear outside Chope's office entrance. A similar bunting was also placed outside his constituency office. Protestors also confronted Chope at his constituency surgery.  As a part of the public backlash to this, definitions of "Chope" and "Choping" were entered into the slang website Urban Dictionary, with the verb "to Chope" being to capture upskirt images, and the noun "a Chope" describing a person who enjoys such images.  

On the same day as the upskirting bill, Chope and Davies forced a delay to the final debate on a bill that would have improved the oversight of the use of force in mental health units. Chope also blocked a bill that would have given extra legal protection to police dogs and horses.

On 16 July 2018, Chope blocked a motion calling for the House of Commons chamber to be used for a Women MPs of the World Conference on a day in November when MPs were not sitting. The conference was due to the mark the centenary of women's suffrage in the United Kingdom; the motion had been moved by Conservative MP Mims Davies and was supported by Andrea Leadsom, the Leader of the House of Commons. Defending his actions, Chope stated that the Commons chamber should only be used by elected parliamentarians, with the exception of its annual use by the UK Youth Parliament. Alongside Conservative MP Sir Desmond Swayne, Chope tabled an amendment to the motion which would require the conference to invite only parliamentarians and hold a debate while using the chamber. Following Chope's actions, the government resubmitted the motion with the support of several departments.

On 23 November 2018, Chope objected to a bill that would have amended the Children Act 1989 in order to increase the protective power of courts over girls at risk of female genital mutilation. Defending his actions, Chope said that the bill was an act of "virtue signalling". Lord Berkeley of Knighton, who had introduced the bill to the House of Lords, called for Chope to be deselected. On 8 February 2019, Chope again blocked the bill. However on 15 March 2019, the bill received its Royal Assent and became law.

On 15 November 2021, it was reported that Chope had objected to a motion from the Select Committee on Standards that would have passed the report regarding the lobbying rules breached by Owen Paterson. The Guardian reported that this was said to have caused fury within the Conservative Parliamentary Party, as it was hoping the vote would draw a line underneath the episode and allow the government to move on from accusations of sleaze, but simply allowed the criticism to continue. His actions led to newspaper comments from MPs, describing both him and his action in unflattering terms. One minister expressed anonymously that "He has been for many year a Jurassic embarrassment – tonight he crossed a line. The man should retire and the executive are livid".

Personal life
On 20 April 1987, Chope married Christine Mary, daughter of Robert Hutchinson, of Wimborne, in Wimborne Minster. Prior to their marriage, Christine had been employed as Chope's House of Commons' secretary and researcher for three years. They have two children.

References

External links
 Chris Chope for Christchurch
 
 Guardian Unlimited Politics – Ask Aristotle: Christopher Chope MP
 Christchurch Conservatives
 Greg Palast investigates Christopher Chope for BBC's Newsnight
 BBC News – Christopher Chope profile 30 March 2006
 

1947 births
Living people
Conservative Party (UK) MPs for English constituencies
Politics of Dorset
Councillors in the London Borough of Wandsworth
Alumni of the University of Dundee
Alumni of the University of St Andrews
Officers of the Order of the British Empire
British Eurosceptics
People from Putney
People educated at Marlborough College
UK MPs 1983–1987
UK MPs 1987–1992
UK MPs 1997–2001
UK MPs 2001–2005
UK MPs 2005–2010
UK MPs 2010–2015
UK MPs 2015–2017
UK MPs 2017–2019
UK MPs 2019–present
Knights Bachelor
Ernst & Young people
Politicians awarded knighthoods